He Yupeng (born 5 December 1999) is a Chinese professional footballer who currently plays as a defender for Chinese Super League club Dalian Professional.

Club career
He Yupeng previously played for the Dalian Yifang U19 team and also represented the China U20 team. He would be promoted to the Dalian Yifang's (now known as Dalian Professional) first team squad in the 2019 Chinese Super League campaign as an under 23 years old player. He made his debut on 7 April 2019 against Tianjin TEDA as part of the Chinese Super League rules requesting every team to field at least one player under 23 years old within the starting lineup, but was substituted off after just 18 minutes, in a match that ended in a 2-1 defeat. While initially only being used to fulfil a quota, he would start to actually establish himself within the team and went on to score his first league goal against Shenzhen FC on 19 May 2019, as a late substitute that came on the 90th minute to score the winning goal in a 2-1 victory.

International career
On 20 July 2022, He made his international debut in a 3-0 defeat against South Korea in the 2022 EAFF E-1 Football Championship, as the Chinese FA decided to field the U-23 national team for this senior competition.

Career statistics
.

References

External links
 

1999 births
Living people
Chinese footballers
Footballers from Liaoning
Sportspeople from Liaoning
Dalian Professional F.C. players
Chinese Super League players
Association football midfielders
China under-20 international footballers